Dayne Zorko (born 9 February 1989) is a professional Australian rules footballer playing for the Brisbane Lions in the Australian Football League (AFL). Zorko is a five-time Merrett–Murray Medallist and was selected in the 2017 All-Australian team. He was also the Lions' leading goalkicker in 2016 and 2017. Zorko served as Brisbane Lions captain from 2018 through to 2022.

Early life
Zorko was born and raised on the Gold Coast where he attended Benowa State High School throughout his teenage years. His Slovenian father immigrated from Yugoslavia to Melbourne before settling on the Gold Coast and having children. His brother, Beau, is the former senior coach of the Broadbeach Cats and Surfers Paradise Demons. Dayne participated in Auskick at Surfers Paradise at the age of four and went on to play more than 250 junior and senior games for the club, which included an under-16 premiership where he played alongside future AFL players Ricky Petterd, Brent Renouf and Jesse White. In 2007, he decided to switch clubs to Broadbeach for his final year of junior football in pursuit of top level QAFL exposure to increase his AFL draft chances. Zorko captained Queensland during the 2007 AFL Under 18 Championships and was named the state's best player during the national carnival, but was overlooked in the 2007 AFL draft. He remained at Broadbeach for the 2008 season and picked up his first senior best-and-fairest award but was again overlooked in the 2008 AFL draft.

In March 2009 the newly formed GC17 consortium invited a then 20-year-old Zorko to train with their under-18 TAC Cup team, which Zorko hoped would lead to a VFL contract with the club for the following season but Gold Coast's interest waned after two weeks. By the end of the 2010 season, Zorko had amassed three consecutive senior best-and-fairest awards at Broadbeach but still failed to capture the interest of any AFL clubs. He found himself at a crossroad when being offered contracts to play in higher standard state leagues outside of Queensland but eventually decided to stay at Broadbeach for the 2011 NEAFL season. Broadbeach coach Matt Angus knew Zorko had the skills to make it in the AFL but described his professionalism as "nowhere near that" required of an AFL player. At the conclusion of the 2011 season, after winning the NEAFL's Syd Guildford Trophy as the Football Record Player of the Year, along with a fourth consecutive club best-and-fairest with Broadbeach, he was put back on AFL recruiters' radars. Zorko later revealed his reason for staying in Queensland was the hope that the recently established Gold Coast Suns AFL team would draft him with their local access zone concessions.

AFL career
Zorko made his AFL debut against  at the Gabba in round 7, 2012, and quickly made a name for himself as a small half-forward flank who could kick freakish goals, leading to the nickname "The Magician". He quickly became a cult figure at the Lions despite the team's woes, with Michael Voss being sacked as coach before the end of the 2013 season and the Lions hovering around the lower reaches of the ladder for several seasons.

After a consistent first few seasons, Zorko was named as the joint winner of the Merrett–Murray Medal in 2015 as Brisbane's best-and-fairest, alongside Dayne Beams, Stefan Martin and Mitch Robinson. He went on to also win the award in 2016 and 2017, as well as lead the Lions' goalkicking during those seasons, and was also selected in the 2017 All-Australian team as a half-forward.

Zorko replaced Beams as the Lions' captain during the 2018 season after Beams stepped down from the captaincy for personal reasons, with Harris Andrews taking over as vice-captain from Zorko. His first match as captain was in round 10 against  at the Gabba.

After Brisbane lost to Melbourne in round 23 of the 2022 season, former St Kilda player Nick Riewoldt questioned whether Zorko's style of leadership suited the team, saying 'I’m not sure what he thinks he’s trying to do from a leadership point of view with that group but it’s clearly not working. When you carry on and the fake toughness, it’s distracting the team.' Zorko subsequently apologised for an inappropriate comment he made during that game to a Melbourne player, saying in a statement 'I understand I need to be a better leader, and have spoken with the Club who have reinforced this."

Zorko stood down as captain of the Brisbane Lions ahead of the 2023 season.

Statistics
Updated to the end of the 2022 season.

|-
| 2012 ||  || 15
| 16 || 16 || 14 || 168 || 146 || 314 || 74 || 103 || 1.0 || 0.9 || 10.5 || 9.1 || 19.6 || 4.6 || 6.4 || 6
|-
| 2013 ||  || 15
| 22 || 26 || 27 || 193 || 139 || 332 || 57 || 117 || 1.2 || 1.2 || 8.8 || 6.3 || 15.1 || 2.6 || 5.3 || 3
|-
| 2014 ||  || 15
| 21 || 18 || 16 || 222 || 244 || 466 || 59 || 115 || 0.9 || 0.8 || 10.6 || 11.6 || 22.2 || 2.8 || 5.5 || 8
|-
| 2015 ||  || 15
| 22 || 18 || 11 || 300 || 205 || 505 || 98 || 85 || 0.8 || 0.5 || 13.6 || 9.3 || 22.3 || 4.5 || 3.9 || 5
|-
| 2016 ||  || 15
| 20 || 23 || 16 || 300 || 171 || 471 || 83 || 128 || 1.2 || 0.8 || 15.0 || 8.6 || 23.6 || 4.2 || 6.4 || 5
|-
| 2017 ||  || 15
| 21 || 34 || 27 || 341 || 185 || 526 || 79 || 147 || 1.6 || 1.3 || 16.2 || 8.8 || 25.1 || 3.8 || 7.0 || 14
|-
| 2018 ||  || 15
| 22 || 26 || 18 || 302 || 155 || 457 || 54 || 159 || 1.2 || 0.8 || 13.7 || 7.0 || 20.8 || 2.5 || 7.2 || 6
|-
| 2019 ||  || 15
| 24 || 23 || 19 || 404 || 132 || 536 || 94 || 160 || 1.0 || 0.8 || 16.8 || 5.5 || 22.3 || 3.9 || 6.7 || 19
|-
| 2020 ||  || 15
| 17 || 9 || 15 || 222 || 64 || 286 || 65 || 75 || 0.5 || 0.9 || 13.1 || 3.8 || 16.8 || 3.8 || 4.4 || 0
|-
| 2021 ||  || 15
| 23 || 17 || 18 || 386 || 169 || 555 || 122 || 140 || 0.7 || 0.8 || 16.8 || 7.4 || 24.1 || 5.3 || 6.1 || 14
|-
| 2022 ||  || 15
| 22 || 6 || 9 || 323 || 114 || 437 || 127 || 64 || 0.3 || 0.4 || 14.7 || 5.2 || 19.9 || 5.8 || 2.9 || 5
|- class=sortbottom
! colspan=3 | Career
! 230 !! 216 !! 190 !! 3161 !! 1724 !! 4885 !! 912 !! 1293 !! 0.9 !! 0.8 !! 13.7 !! 7.5 !! 21.2 !! 4.0 !! 5.6 !! 85
|}

Notes

Honours and achievements
Individual
 Brisbane Lions captain: 2018–2022
 All-Australian team: 2017
 5× Merrett–Murray Medal: 2015, 2016, 2017, 2018, 2021
 2× Brisbane Lions leading Goalkicker: 2016, 2017
 Australian representative honours in International Rules Football: 2017

References

External links

1989 births
Living people
Australian rules footballers from Queensland
Brisbane Lions players
Brisbane Lions captains
Broadbeach Australian Football Club players
Sportspeople from the Gold Coast, Queensland
Merrett–Murray Medal winners
Australian people of Slovenian descent
All-Australians (AFL)
Australia international rules football team players